Manuela Tesse  (born 28 February 1976 in Sassari) is an Italian footballer who played as a midfielder for the Italy women's national football team. She was part of the team at the UEFA Women's Euro 1997, 1999 FIFA Women's World Cup and UEFA Women's Euro 2001.

References

External links
 

1976 births
Living people
Italian women's footballers
Italy women's international footballers
People from Sassari
1999 FIFA Women's World Cup players
Women's association football midfielders
Footballers from Sardinia
Serie A (women's football) managers
Torres Calcio Femminile players
S.S. Lazio Women 2015 players
ACF Milan players
Torino Women A.S.D. players
Sardinian women